Operation Valkyrie was a German World War II emergency continuity of government operations plan issued to the Territorial Reserve Army of Germany to execute and implement in the event of a general breakdown in civil order of the nation. Failure of the government to maintain control of civil affairs might have been caused by the Allied bombing of German cities, or uprising of the millions of foreign forced labourers working in German factories.

German Army (Heer) officers, General Friedrich Olbricht, Major General Henning von Tresckow and Colonel Claus von Stauffenberg modified the plan with the intention of using it to take control of German cities, disarm the SS, and arrest the Nazi leadership once Hitler had been assassinated in the 20 July plot. Hitler's death (as opposed to his arrest) was required to free German soldiers from their oath of loyalty to him (Reichswehreid). After lengthy preparation, the plot was activated in 1944 but failed.

The original operation
The original plan, designed to deal with internal disturbances in emergency situations, ensured combat readiness of units among scattered elements of the Reserve Army. It was developed by General Friedrich Olbricht's staff in his capacity as head of General Army Office and was approved by Hitler. However, apart from Hitler himself, only Colonel-General Friedrich Fromm, Chief of the Reserve Army since 1938, could initiate Operation Valkyrie.

Coup-oriented revisions 

The idea of using the Reserve Army in the German homeland to unseat the Nazi regime had existed before, but Fromm's refusal to cooperate in a prospective coup posed a serious obstacle to the conspirators. Nevertheless, after the lessons of a failed assassination attempt on 13 March 1943, Olbricht felt that the original coup plan--which anticipated a more spontaneous uprising--was inadequate and that the Reserve Army should be used even without Fromm's cooperation.

The original Valkyrie order only dealt with combat readiness of Reserve Army units. Olbricht added a second part, 'Valkyrie II', which provided for the swift mustering of these units into battle groups ready for action.

In August and September 1943, co-conspirator Major General Henning von Tresckow, finding Olbricht's revision inadequate, greatly expanded the Valkyrie plan by new supplementary orders that undermined the staunchest Nazi institutions by implicating them in Hitler's death. A secret declaration began with the words: "The Führer Adolf Hitler is dead! A treacherous group of party leaders has attempted to exploit the situation by attacking our embattled soldiers from the rear to seize power for themselves."

With this premise securing the credible motivation for the Reserve Army to seize control of the organs of state, detailed instructions were written for the occupation of government ministries in Berlin, of Himmler's headquarters in East Prussia, of radio stations, of telephone exchanges, of other Nazi infrastructure through military districts and of concentration camps. (Previously, it was believed that Colonel Claus Schenk von Stauffenberg was mainly responsible for the Valkyrie plan, but documents recovered by the Soviet Union after the war and released in 2007 suggest that a detailed plan was developed by Tresckow in autumn 1943.) All documents were handled by Tresckow's wife, Erika, and by Margarete von Oven, his secretary. Both women wore gloves so as to leave no fingerprints.

In essence, the coup plan involved tricking the Reserve Army into the seizure and removal of the civilian government and paramilitary organizations of wartime Germany under the false pretence that the SS had attempted a coup and assassinated Hitler. The conspirators depended on the assumption that the rank-and-file soldiers and junior officers designated to execute Operation Valkyrie would be motivated to do so on the basis of their false belief that the Nazi civilian leadership had behaved with disloyalty and treason against the state and the leaser to whom the army has sworn allegiance, and were therefore required to be removed. The conspirators counted on the soldiers to obey their orders so long as they came from a legitimate channel—namely, the Reserve Army High Command—in the emergency situation following Hitler's putative death.

Apart from Hitler, only Colonel-General Friedrich Fromm, as commander of the Reserve Army, could activate Operation Valkyrie. For the planned coup to succeed, therefore, the plotters had either to win Fromm over to the conspiracy or to neutralize him in some way. Fromm, like many senior officers, knew about the military conspiracies against Hitler in general terms, but neither supported them nor reported them to the Gestapo.

The orders, which on July 20 were transmitted but never fully implemented, illustrate the scope and detail of the planing, as well as the dual military and political aims: The disarming of the SS and the SD, as well as the reorientation of governmental and military actions away from what the conspirators considered to be the lawlessness of the Nazi regime.

Initial order to the Wehrkreise (Military Districts)

See source.

Order to General Government of Poland

Particularly notable for its apparent anticipation of the release of "political prisoners" from concentration camps in the General Government of occupied Poland, this telex is preserved in the Bundesarchiv. See source matter.

Execution

The key role in its actual implementation was played by Colonel Claus Schenk Graf von Stauffenberg, after his assassination attempt on Hitler on 20 July 1944. Stauffenberg also further improved the Valkyrie plan and made changes to address changing situations.

Stauffenberg's position as Chief of Staff of the Reserve Army gave him access to Hitler for reports and at the same time required his presence at headquarters for implementation of Valkyrie. At first, Tresckow and Stauffenberg sought out other officers with access to Hitler who could carry out the assassination.

General Helmuth Stieff, Chief of Organization in Army High Command, volunteered to be the assassin but later backed down. Tresckow attempted several times to be assigned to Hitler's headquarters without success. Finally, Stauffenberg decided to carry out both the assassination attempt and the Valkyrie operation, which greatly reduced the chance of success. After two abortive attempts, Stauffenberg placed the bomb on 20 July and hurried back to Berlin to assume his pivotal role.

Discovering from Field Marshal Wilhelm Keitel that the bomb had not killed Hitler, Fromm refused to initiate Valkyrie, only to learn that General Friedrich Olbricht had initiated in his name; refusing to co-operate, he was removed and arrested by the conspirators and replaced by General Erich Hoepner. Meanwhile, Carl-Heinrich von Stülpnagel, military governor of occupied France, managed to disarm the SD and SS, and captured most of their leadership. He travelled to Günther von Kluge's headquarters and asked him to contact the Allies, only to be informed that Hitler was alive.

By this time Reichsführer-SS Heinrich Himmler had taken charge of the situation and had issued orders countermanding Olbricht's mobilisation of Operation Valkyrie. This led to the failure of the coup, with most of the commanding officers learning that Hitler was alive and cancelling their operations.

When it was clear that the coup had failed, the less resolute members of the conspiracy in Berlin began to change sides. Fromm was freed from his detention room and, after a brief fight, he managed to regain control of the Bendlerblock. In a desperate attempt to cover his involvement, he ordered the executions of General Friedrich Olbricht, his chief of staff Colonel Albrecht Mertz von Quirnheim, Colonel Claus von Stauffenberg and his adjutant Lieutenant Werner von Haeften. Shortly after midnight, the condemned men were led to a mound of earth back-lit by idling vehicles where each was executed by firing squad in the courtyard of Bendlerstraße headquarters. (The street has since been renamed Stauffenbergstraße in honour of Colonel Stauffenberg.) Further executions were forbidden following the arrival of Waffen-SS personnel under the command of Obersturmbannfüher Otto Skorzeny.

See also
 Assassination attempts on Adolf Hitler
 List of members of the 20 July plot
 Fighter Pilots' Revolt

Bibliography

English

German

References

External links
 German Resistance to Hitler – Valkyrie Conspiracy – German Conspiracy against the German government culminating in the Coup Attempt of 20 July 1944
 The Conference Room at the "Wolf's Lair" after the Assassination Attempt (20 July 1944) from German History in Documents and Images a project of the German Historical Institute
 Adolf Hitler – antihero of the 20th century
 Telex Message by the Conspiratorial Stauffenberg Group to the holders of executive Power (20 July 1944) from German History in Documents and Images a project of the German Historical Institute
 The assassination attempt from 20 July 1944 and operation "Valkyrie" 
 Operation Valkyrie (History Channel documentary)
 Consequences 

Valkyrie
1944 in Germany
20 July plot
German resistance to Nazism
Military of Nazi Germany
Continuity of government
Valkyrie